Daniel Edward Murtaugh (October 8, 1917 – December 2, 1976) was an American second baseman, manager, front-office executive, and coach in Major League Baseball (MLB). He also played 416 of his 767 career MLB games with the Pirates as their second baseman.

Life and career

As player
Murtaugh appeared in all or parts of nine big-league seasons, initially for the Philadelphia Phillies (1941–43, 1946) and Boston Braves (1947) before joining the Pirates (1948–51).

A native of Chester, Pennsylvania, Murtaugh was working with his father at Sun Shipbuilding & Drydock Co. after he graduated from Chester High School when he took a pay cut to start his professional baseball career  at age 19 in 1937. After signing with the St. Louis Cardinals, he joined the Redbirds' extensive farm system, initially as a member of the Cambridge (Maryland) Cardinals of the Class D Eastern Shore League. In June 1941, in the midst of Murtaugh's second consecutive stellar season with the Houston Buffaloes of the Texas League, the Phillies purchased his contract; he then made his MLB debut on July 3 as a defensive replacement for Hal Marnie against Boston at Braves Field. The following day he started both ends of a July 4 doubleheader and essentially took over as the Phils' regular second baseman.

As a rookie, Murtaugh led the National League in stolen bases with 18, even though he played only 85 games after his acquisition from Houston in late June. In 1942–43 he got into 257 games before joining the United States Army in August 1943 for World War II service. He declined the opportunity to play baseball in the United States and served in combat with the 97th Infantry in Germany.

At Triple-A Rochester, Murtaugh hit .322 and his 174 hits were tied for first in the International League. The Braves then selected him in the 1946 Rule 5 draft, but Murtaugh played in only three early-season games for them before he was again sent to Triple-A. At 29, he had another good offensive season, hitting .302 for Milwaukee. Although his performance did not earn Murtaugh a return to the Braves, it led to perhaps his biggest break when, on November 18, Boston included him in a five-player trade to the Pirates, where he spent the rest of his big-league career. 
 
His most productive season came in his first year with the Bucs, when he hit .290 and posted career highs in hits (149), runs batted in (71), runs scored (56), doubles (21), triples (5) and games played (146). He started a career-high 145 games as the Pirates' second baseman. Overall, Murtaugh was a .254 career lifetime batter with 661 hits, eight home runs and 219 RBI in 767 games.

As manager
After retiring as a player, Murtaugh managed the New Orleans Pelicans (1952–54), the Pirates' Double-A farm club, and the unaffiliated Triple-A Charleston Senators (April 19–July 16, 1955). In 1956 he returned to the Pirates as a coach under Bobby Bragan. In his second year in the job, on August 4, 1957, he succeeded Bragan as skipper with the Bucs 36–67 and one game out of last place; under Murtaugh, they perked up to win 26 of their final 51 games. In his first full season, Murtaugh led the Pirates to a surprise second-place finish in the National League. He went on to hold the Pittsburgh job for all or parts of fifteen seasons over four different terms (1957–64, 1967, 1970–71, 1973–76).

In , his third full season as their manager, Murtaugh guided the Bucs to the first of the two World Series championships they won under his command. After they captured the National League pennant by seven full games over the Milwaukee Braves, they stunned the heavy-hitting New York Yankees in the 1960 World Series—won in Pittsburgh's last at bat by Bill Mazeroski's walk-off home run in the ninth inning of Game 7. The Yankees outscored Pittsburgh 55–27, and administered three thrashings (16–3, 10–0 and 12–0), but the resilient Pirates took the other four contests by a run differential of only +7 (6–4, 3–2, 5–2 and 10–9).

From 1961–64, his Pirates had only one over-.500 season and, after the conclusion of the  campaign, Murtaugh stepped down as manager just before his 47th birthday. He had been battling health problems, sometimes reported as a heart ailment. He moved up to the Pirate front office as a key assistant in charge of evaluating players for general manager Joe L. Brown. After the 1965 season, he turned down feelers from the Boston Red Sox to join their organization as vice president, player personnel.

Well aware of the abundance of talent in the Pittsburgh system, Murtaugh asked to reclaim the managing job after Larry Shepard was fired in the last week of the  season. Once medically cleared, he began his third term as skipper of the Pirates on October 9, 1969; hours after Murtaugh's re-hiring, Don Hoak, 41, his third baseman on the 1960 World Series champions and a manager in the Pirates' farm system, died of a heart attack after believing he was a leading contender to manage the parent club.

Murtaugh's first two clubs won the 1970–71 National League East Division titles. Although the  squad fell in that season's National League Championship Series to the Cincinnati Reds, Murtaugh's 1971 Pirates would bounce back. On September 1, 1971, Murtaugh was the first manager in major league history to field a starting lineup consisting of nine black players (including both African Americans and Afro-Latin Americans); the Pirates beat the Phillies 10–7 in that game. The next month, they defeated the San Francisco Giants in the NLCS and then captured the 1971 World Series with a memorable comeback from a two-games-to-none deficit against the favored Baltimore Orioles. That World Series was marked by the brilliant performance of future Baseball Hall of Famer Roberto Clemente, who batted .414 with twelve hits to lead his team to the championship.

Citing renewed health concerns — he had been hospitalized for chest pain during the 1971 season — Murtaugh again resigned as manager after the world title. He moved back into the Pittsburgh front office, and his hand-picked successor, Bill Virdon (center fielder for his 1960 champions), took over for  — although Murtaugh, as manager of the reigning World Series champs, did return to uniform to manage the National League entry in the 1972 Major League Baseball All-Star Game in Atlanta, a 4–3 triumph for the Senior Circuit. 

With the  Pirates scuffling with a 67–69 mark on September 5, Brown fired Virdon and asked Murtaugh to reclaim his old job. Just two months after his retirement, Murtaugh died in Chester from a stroke at age 59. The number 40 he wore as the Bucs' manager was retired by the Pirates on April 7, 1977.

Murtaugh was a two-time winner (1960 and 1971) of The Sporting News Manager of the Year Award. He compiled a 1,115–950–3 record in 2,068 games (.540), second in Pirates history behind only Fred Clarke. In addition to his two National League pennants and world championships, he won four Eastern Division titles (1970–71, 1974–75), and no Pirates manager has won more division titles in a tenure since his death. In twelve full seasons as manager, he led the Pirates to a winning record nine times; his five postseason appearances with the Pirates is still the most by any manager in team history.

Managerial record

Highlights 

 Led NL in stolen bases (1941)
 Led NL second basemen in putouts, assists and double plays (1948)
 Finished 9th in the NL MVP selection (1948)
 Selected "Man of the Year" by Sport magazine (1960)
 Twice received The Sporting News Manager of the Year Award (1960, 1970)
 Three-time Dapper Dan Award-winner (1958, 1970, 1971)
 One of 65 managers in major league history to win 1,000 or more games, and one of only twelve  to win 1,000 games while also not losing 1,000 games

See also 
 List of Major League Baseball retired numbers
 List of Major League Baseball annual stolen base leaders
 List of Major League Baseball managers by wins
 Tim Murtaugh

References 

 "Baseball Pays Its Respects to Murtaugh at Funeral", The New York Times, Dec. 7, 1976.
"A great manager, a great man" Hroncich, Colleen, Columbia, (KofC, New Haven, CT, July 2016)

Notes

External links 

Danny Murtaugh at Baseball Almanac
 Baseball Hall of Fame – 2008 Veterans Committee candidate profile
 
Danny Murtaugh photo tribute at Pittsburgh Post-Gazette (commemorating 50th anniversary of 1960 Bucs' World Series victory over the Yankees)
 Andy Sturgill, Danny Murtaugh. Society for American Baseball Research Biography Project

1917 births
1976 deaths
American sportsmen
Baseball players from Pennsylvania
Boston Braves players
Cambridge Cardinals players
Chester High School alumni
Columbus Red Birds players
Houston Buffaloes players
Major League Baseball first base coaches
Major League Baseball managers with retired numbers
Major League Baseball second basemen
Milwaukee Brewers (minor league) players
Minor league baseball managers
National League stolen base champions
New Orleans Pelicans (baseball) players
People from Delaware County, Pennsylvania
Philadelphia Phillies players
Pittsburgh Pirates coaches
Pittsburgh Pirates managers
Pittsburgh Pirates players
Pittsburgh Pirates scouts
Rochester Red Wings players
Sportspeople from Chester, Pennsylvania
United States Army personnel of World War II
Mu